The 2018–19 VCU Rams men's basketball team represented Virginia Commonwealth University during the 2018–19 NCAA Division I men's basketball season. The Rams were led by Mike Rhoades in his second season as head coach at VCU. The Rams played their home games at Stuart C. Siegel Center in Richmond, Virginia as members of the Atlantic 10 Conference. They finished the season 25-8, 16-2 in A-10 Play to finish in 1st place. In the quarterfinals of the A-10 tournament, they were upset by Rhode Island. They received an at-large bid to the NCAA tournament where they lost in the first round to UCF.

Background 

The previous season was Mike Rhoades' first season as head coach. The Rams finished the 2017–18 season 18–15, 9–9 in A-10 play to finish tied for fifth place. VCU defeated Dayton in the A-10 Tournament to advance to the quarterfinals, where they lost to Rhode Island. The Rams, for the first time since 2010 failed to earn an at-large bid into the NCAA Tournament or NIT. The Rams had been invited to play in the CBI and CIT tournaments, but declined. It was the first time since 2006 the Rams failed to have a 20-win season, and the first time since that same year the Rams did not play in a postseason tournament.

Offseason

Departures

Transfers

2018 recruiting class

Honors and awards

Preseason Awards 
Street & Smith's
 All-Newcomer - Marcus Evans
 All-Sharpshooter - De'Riante Jenkins

Athlon Sports
All-Atlantic 10 First Team - Marcus Evans

Roster

Preseason

Schedule and results 

|-
!colspan=12 style=| Exhibition

|-
!colspan=12 style=| Non-conference regular season

|-
!colspan=12 style=|Atlantic 10 regular season

|-
!colspan=12 style=| Atlantic 10 tournament

|-
!colspan=12 style=| NCAA tournament

References 

VCU
VCU Rams men's basketball seasons
VCU Rams men's basketball
VCU Rams men's basketball
VCU